A penumbral lunar eclipse took place on Wednesday, August 27, 1969, the second of three penumbral lunar eclipses in 1969, the first being on Wednesday, April 2, and the last being on Thursday, September 25.
This is the last lunar eclipse of Saros 108.

Visibility

Relation to other lunar eclipses

Lunar year series

See also
List of lunar eclipses
List of 20th-century lunar eclipses

Notes

External links

1969-08
1969 in science